118 Squadron or 118th Squadron may refer to:

 118 Squadron (Israel)
 No. 118 Squadron RCAF, Canada
 No. 118 Squadron RAF, United Kingdom
 118th Aero Squadron, created in August 1917 on Kelly Field, Texas as an Air Service, United States Army unit; re-designated in February 1918; see 118th Airlift Squadron
 118th Aero Squadron, created in April 1918 on Brooks Field, Texas as an Air Service, United States Army unit; re-designated in July 1918
 118th Airlift Squadron, United States Air Force
 118th Air Support Operations Squadron, United States Air Force
 118th Fighter Squadron, United States Air Force
 118th Observation Squadron, United States Army Air Force
 VPB-118, United States Navy

See also
 118th Wing